Rostock Power Station is a bituminous coal-fired combined heat and power plant operated by Kraftwerks- und Netzgesellschaft mbH (KNG), located in Rostock, Germany. Construction on the plant began in June 1991, and test firing and grid connection were carried out from March to September, 1994. In October of that year it entered normal service.

In addition to a generating capacity of 553 MWe, the station also feeds the Rostock district heating net.  A notable feature of the Rostock Power Station is that the 160 metre tall cooling tower also serves as chimney.

External links 

 Official homepage

Coal-fired power stations in Germany
PowerStation
PowerStation
Companies based in Mecklenburg-Western Pomerania
PowerStation